Archie Harvey (born November 3, 1992) is a Liberian footballer who plays as a defender or midfielder for Europa Point in the Gibraltar National League.

Club 
Harvey started his career with Gedi & Sons FC in the Liberian league. In 2011, he was signed by Mighty Barrolle, a club playing in the Liberian First Division.

Swedish coach Johan Sandahl then scouted the Liberian winger and brought him to his native country in 2013. He first played two seasons with Nordvärmland FF in the Swedish fourth division, before signing with Motala AIF in 2015. Harvey then signed with Södertälje FK in 2016, and moved to Arameisk-Syrianska IF in 2017.

National team 
Harvey played eight matches for the Liberian national team in 2011. He appeared in the West Africa Football Union (WAFU) tournament held in Nigeria. He was part of the senior team that settled 0–0 against Angola during the international fixture at SKD complex in Monrovia.

References 

 https://svenskfotboll.se/cuper-och-serier/information/?scr=result&fmid=3494787
 https://svenskfotboll.se/cuper-och-serier/information/?scr=result&fmid=3218101
 https://svenskfotboll.se/cuper-och-serier/information/?scr=result&fmid=3218006
 https://web.archive.org/web/20160303044846/http://www6.idrottonline.se/MotalaAIFFK-Fotboll/SENIOR/A-LAGET/A-NYHETER/Vinstiaretsforstatraningsmatch/
 http://www.nordvarmlandsff.se/nyheter/archie-harvey-klar-tva-ar-nordvarmland/
 http://fotbolltransfers.com/site/news/48309
 http://www.vf.se/sport/fotboll/nordvarmlands-harvey-nara-provspel-i-degerfors
 http://www.fotbolldirekt.se/2014/06/19/sirius-intresserade-av-mittfaltaren-archie/ >
 http://www.fotbolltransfers.com/site/player/6814

1992 births
Living people
Sportspeople from Monrovia
Liberian footballers
Association football midfielders
Mighty Barrolle players
Motala AIF players
Assyriska FF players
Nybergsund IL players
Europa Point F.C. players
Liberian expatriate footballers
Expatriate footballers in Sweden
Liberian expatriate sportspeople in Sweden
Expatriate footballers in Norway
Liberian expatriate sportspeople in Norway
Expatriate footballers in Gibraltar
Liberian expatriate sportspeople in Gibraltar